Two-time defending champion Margaret Court defeated Evonne Goolagong in the final, 2–6, 7–6(7–0), 7–5 to win the women's singles tennis title at the 1971 Australian Open. It was her tenth Australian Open title, her sixth consecutive major singles title and her 21st major singles title overall.

Seeds
The first and second seeds receive a bye into the second round.

  Margaret Court (champion)
  Evonne Goolagong (finalist)
  Lesley Turner Bowrey (withdrew before the tournament began)
  Gail Chanfreau (first round)
  Patti Hogan (second round)
  Kerry Harris (first round)
  Winnie Shaw (semifinals)
  Helen Gourlay (quarterfinals)

Draw

Finals

Earlier rounds

Section 1

Section 2

External links
 1971 Australian Open – Women's draws and results at the International Tennis Federation

Women's singles
Australian Open (tennis) by year – Women's singles
1971 Women's Tennis Circuit
1971 in Australian women's sport